Dauda is a West African surname. Notable people with the surname include:

 Abiola Dauda (born 1988), Nigerian footballer
 Collins Dauda, Ghanaian politician 
 Fatau Dauda, Ghanaian footballer
 Fuseini Dauda, Ghanaian footballer
 J. B. Dauda, Sierra Leonean politician

Surnames of African origin